The song "You're My Everything" is a 1967 single recorded by The Temptations for Berry Gordy's Motown record label. It is the first of three singles, and four songs to be co-written for the group by Motown songwriter Rodger Penzabene. It reached number three on the U.S. R&B chart and number six on the U.S. Pop chart. It would be the third single from the group's 1967 album The Temptations with a Lot o' Soul.

This is one of two A-sides led by Eddie Kendricks since David Ruffin (who leads on the bridge and ad-libs on the outro) became the Temptations' lead singer, the previous being the 1966 song "Get Ready". 

The single is backed by a cover of The Miracles "I've Been Good to You", also led by Kendrick. As such, it is one of the few singles by The Temptations where both sides charted (it peaked at number twenty-four on the Billboard Bubbling Under Hot 100 charts). The single has been sampled by a number of notable artists including Gladys Knight & The Pips (sample released 1968), Fred Hughes (released 1968), Lloyd Charmers (released 1974), Simone Kopmajer (March 2017).

Personnel
 Lead vocals by Eddie Kendricks and David Ruffin (bridge and outro)
 Background vocals by David Ruffin, Melvin Franklin, Paul Williams, and Otis Williams
Guitar by Cornelius Grant
Other instrumentation by The Funk Brothers

References

1967 singles
The Temptations songs
Songs written by Norman Whitfield
Songs written by Rodger Penzabene
Songs written by Cornelius Grant
Gordy Records singles
1967 songs
Song recordings produced by Norman Whitfield